A polyglot is someone who speaks multiple languages.

Polyglot may also refer to:

 Polyglot (book), a book that contains the same text in more than one language
 Polyglot (computing), a computer program that is valid in more than one programming language
 Polyglot (webzine), a biweekly game industry webzine published by Polymancer Studios
 Polyglot markup, HTML markup that conforms to both the HTML and XHTML specifications
 Polyglot Petition, a global call for a common cause, such as prohibitionism
 The Polyglots, a 1925 novel by Anglo-Russian William Gerhardie

See also
 
 List of polyglots
 Multilingualism, the use of multiple languages, either by an individual or by a community
 Pidgin, a language that develops between groups who do not share a common language
 Mixed language

pt:Poliglota